

Electric locomotives

Diesel locomotives

Electric multiple units

Diesel multiple units

External links 
 Official website

Rolling stock of Serbia
Serbian Railways